JCPA may refer to:

 The Jean Chrétien Pledge to Africa Act, a piece of Canadian patent legislation allowing the manufacture and export of medicines to countries without local manufacturing capacity
 Jerusalem Center for Public Affairs, a think tank located in Jerusalem
 Jewish Council for Public Affairs, an American-Jewish non-profit organization that represents 14 national and 125 local Jewish community relations agencies.

See also
 The Joint Comprehensive Plan of Action (JCPOA)